Riyad H. Mansour (born 21 May 1947) is a Palestinian-American diplomat and since 2005 has been the Permanent Observer of Palestine to the United Nations. Previous to Mansour's appointment to Permanent Observer, Mansour served as the Deputy Permanent Observer of Palestine to the United Nations from 1983 to 1994. In 2005, President of the Palestinian National Authority Mahmoud Abbas appointed him to succeed Nasser al-Qudwa as Permanent Observer for Palestine to the UN. Under Mansour, the Permanent Observer Mission of Palestine to the United Nations changed from being an "entity" to being a "non-Member Observer State" on 29 November 2012.

Early life and education
Mansour's father moved to the United States in the 1950s as a refugee and became a steelworker in Ohio. He later sent for his seven children from the West Bank, including Riyad, who was  born on 21 May 1947. The refugee family lived in Ramallah, Occupied Palestinian Territories. Riyad Mansour has a Ph.D in Counselling from the University of Akron, a Master of Science degree in Education Counselling, and a Bachelor of Arts degree in Philosophy from Youngstown State University. In 2002, Mansour served as an adjunct professor in the Political Science Department at the University of Central Florida.

See also

 Ibrahim M. Khraishi
Foreign Affairs Minister of the Palestinian National Authority
Foreign relations of the Palestine Liberation Organization

References

External links

American diplomats
Palestinian diplomats
Permanent Observers of Palestine to the United Nations
University of Akron alumni
Youngstown State University alumni
Living people
University of Central Florida faculty
People from Ramallah
Palestinian refugees
1947 births
Ambassadors of the State of Palestine to Costa Rica